Charlie Looker (born May 23, 1980) is an American composer, improviser, vocalist, and guitarist known for his work in experimental metal, contemporary classical, avant-jazz, and Renaissance and Medieval musical forms.

Education and career 

Looker is a graduate of Wesleyan University, where he studied with Anthony Braxton and Alvin Lucier.

Alongside his work as a solo artist, Looker also leads an Early/Renaissance-music inspired project, Seaven Teares; performs improvised "death-jazz" with Period, whose rotating cast includes Darius Jones, Chuck Bettis, and Mike Pride; and leads the industrial-metal duo Psalm Zero, formerly alongside Castevet's Andrew Hock. He is the songwriter, guitarist, and lead vocalist for avant-rock band Extra Life and a former member and co-founder of avant-garde band Zs. He worked with Dirty Projectors and appears on their record Rise Above. Other collaborators include M Lamar,
Mariel Roberts, Ty Braxton, Mary Halvorson, Mick Barr, Tim Berne, Nat Baldwin, Earle Brown, Sam Mickens, Kelly Moran, Dax Riggs, Lingua Ignota, Matthew Welch, Stu Watson, William Parker, and Glenn Branca.

He founded Last Things Records, a label that has released recordings by Extra Life, Larkin Grimm, The Parenthetical Girls,  Psalm Zero, and Sculptress.

In 2011, Looker was named one of NPR Music's "Top 100 Composers Under 40".

Discography

As leader

As co-leader

As sideperson

References

External links
 Charlie Looker Bandcamp
 AllMusic.com credits

Dirty Projectors members
Musicians from New York City
Wesleyan University alumni
Living people
1980 births